Armen Rafayelyan (born 10 February 1978) is an Armenian freestyle skier. He competed in the men's moguls event at the 1998 Winter Olympics.

References

External links
 

1978 births
Living people
Armenian male freestyle skiers
Olympic freestyle skiers of Armenia
Freestyle skiers at the 1998 Winter Olympics
Sportspeople from Yerevan